Katun is the name for the form of medieval self-governing community (family, settlement) in the Balkans. This form of association of people is a consequence of the absence of strong central government, and is observed in documents from the second half of the 14th and 15th centuries. It is often associated with a living style of "Vlachs" (that is, Eastern Romance people) in Bosnia and Herzegovina, Croatia, Montenegro and Serbia, as well as some Albanian and Slavic communities of hill people.

Usually it is described as "mountainous landscape with pastures where people lived temporarily with cattle and where they lived only during the summer in huts". However, this description is more in line with today's distinct form of nomadic pastoralism called transhumance, whereas in the medieval times it had socio-political dimension, and significance in social and state affairs.

Etymology
Katun has changed its physiognomy over time, so it is difficult to pinpoint one definition that would explain exact meaning throughout the history. Over time, katun became a synonym for a particular settlement. Medieval katun is neither a temporary nor permanent summer "stan" or "bačija", in a modern sense of these words. In the area of ​​the medieval Bosnian state, the socio-political life of Vlach population was organized in a specific way, which bear certain similarities with the organization among Vlachs across the neighboring Balkans areas and states.  Various authors have suggested that katun is a word of Illyrian, Thracian, Uro-Altaic, Proto-Bulgarian or some other origin.

Development and earliest records 
Katun consisted of several families or households gathered around one leader who directs the organizational, political and economic goals of his group. The main occupation in the katun was always cattle breeding, almost exclusively sheep and to some extent goats, so the community used to be quite mobile. Earlier, nomadic pastoralism was characterized with the construction of temporary camps under tents. Erection of tents in the 14th and 15th centuries could be interpreted as the gradual expansion of katun (company or group) to new territories, or the first step towards building more permanent settlements (villages) in new territories. The shape and scope of the katuns varied, and their warrior companies were important. These companies used to serve under local Slavic noblemen, who bear titles of vojvodas, or dukes. They sometimes served under foreign militaries, such as the Venetians and the Ottomans. In the end, some groups (katuns) manage to capture larger territories, where there was a lack of influence from the regional or central government and social relations. In the second half of the 14th and 15th centuries, these companies built permanent villages, outside or in the župas themselves. They inhabited the church estates and city districts and townships, which are already subordinated to city municipality or local lords. By settling themselves, these communes bring a certain element of self-governance, gather more scattered villages in their community, and other, usually smaller katuns join them, which were then called "municipalities". Such groups (municipalities, katuns) could encompass a large number of villages and hamlets, and numerous population of different ethnic and/or cultural background.

Earliest katuns in records
The earliest news about the Vlach katuns can be found in the sources of Byzantine provenance, in the letters of Patriarch Nicholas to Emperor Alexius I Comnenus, at the very beginning of the 12th century. The first mentions of Vlach katuns in medieval Bosnia dates from the 14th century and are related to the Burmazi (1300), Banjani (1319), Drobnjaci (1354), Predojevići (1356), Mirilovići (1366), Zlokruha (1367), Žurovići (1367), Ugarci (1368), Vlahovići (1368), Tomići (1369), Vragovići (1376), Plijeske (1377), Prijeraci (1377), Kresojevići (1379), Perutinići (1386), Kutlovići (1393) and Maleševci (1397).

Chieftains 
The elder was chosen from a family that stood out for his wealth and war reputation, and oftentimes, but not always, he would be able to pass the seniority to his descendants. He would govern the community during a movement or war, and would maintain close relation with other elders and representatives of other families. As the katun grew and organizationally developed, warrior petty nobility multiplied, and in feudal organisation would take a title of knez, who would often rule over 40 or 50 individual villages. Family ties among the prominent individuals were important. The commander of the “warrior company” of the katun was usually the katun chieftain, the leader who would bear a specific title called katunar. His son or one of his close relatives (fraternity) would take his place when needed.

See also 

 Morlachs

References

Further reading 
 

Medieval Bosnia and Herzegovina
Medieval Montenegro
 
History of the Aromanians
Hill people
Medieval communes
Types of populated places